Peter Sanders may refer to:

 Peter Sanders (cyclist) (born 1961), British Olympic cyclist
 Peter Sanders (sportsman) (born 1942), Welsh former association football and rugby union player
 Peter Sanders (Indian Army officer) (1911–2003)
 Peter Sanders (computer scientist) (born 1967), German professor
 Peter Sanders (photographer), British photographer